Came a Hot Friday is a 1985 New Zealand comedy film, based on the 1964 novel by Ronald Hugh Morrieson. Directed and co-written by Ian Mune, it became one of the most successful local films released in New Zealand in the 1980s. The film's cast included famed New Zealand comedian Billy T. James.

Plot
In rural New Zealand in 1949, Wes Pennington (Peter Bland) and his partner Cyril (Philip Gordon) are out to run a horse-racing scam for as long as they can. They are inveterate gamblers who have joined forces to trick local bookies, by taking advantage of delayed broadcasts of horse races. After arriving in small town Tainuia Junction, Wes and Cyril get involved in a bootlegging ring, arson and murder. Among a group of local eccentrics, they also meet the Tainuia Kid (Billy T. James), a Maori who believes himself to be a Mexican bandito. He becomes a kind of protector for the duo.

Morrieson's novels featured some sexuality and violence, but the film downplayed these aspects of the source novel and concentrated more on the comical elements. Some argued that the film followed the spirit of the Ealing comedies. One writer argued that the book makes "good-natured, nostalgic fun of small town 1940s New Zealand where Friday night’s excitement is a pie and chips at the boozer" with "larger than life parodic characters".

Cast
 Peter Bland as Wes Pennington
 Phillip Gordon as Cyril Kidman
 Michael Lawrence as Don Jackson
 Billy T. James as The Tainuia Kid
 Marshall Napier as Sel Bishop
 Don Selwyn as Norm Cray
 Marise Wipani as Esmerelda
 Erna Larsen as Dinah
 Philip Holder as Dick
 Tricia Phillips as Claire
 Bruce Allpress as Don's Dad
 Michael Morrissey as Morrie
 Roy Billing as Darkie Benson
 Hemi Rapata as Kohi
 Bridget Armstrong as Aunt Agg
 Prince Tui Teka as Saxophonist

Home media
The film was released on DVD on 6 July 2011.

Awards

New Zealand Film and TV Awards

External links
 
 Came a Hot Friday at Rotten Tomatoes website 
 Came A Hot Friday at NZonScreen (with video extracts)

References

1985 films
1980s New Zealand films
New Zealand comedy films
Films set in New Zealand
1980s English-language films
1985 comedy films
Films set in the 1940s
Films based on New Zealand novels
Films directed by Ian Mune